Associação Esportiva Colorado, commonly known as Colorado, was a Brazilian football club based in Caarapó, Mato Grosso do Sul state.

History
The club was founded in 1978. Colorado competed in the Campeonato Sul-Mato-Grossense Second Level in 2010, when they finished in the third position in their group in the First Stage, thus failing to qualify to the Second Stage, but finishing in the fifth place overall. They finished in the second position in the Campeonato Sul-Mato-Grossense Second Level in 2011, after being defeated in the final by Misto and thus achieving promotion to the 2012 Campeonato Sul-Mato-Grossense.

Stadium
Associação Esportiva Colorado played their home games at Estádio Municipal de Caarapó, nicknamed Carecão. The stadium has a maximum capacity of 4,000 people.

References

Association football clubs established in 1978
Association football clubs disestablished in 2020
Defunct football clubs in Mato Grosso do Sul
1978 establishments in Brazil
2020 disestablishments in Brazil